, sometimes credited as Professor F or Arthur King, is a Japanese video game designer, involved in the development of many classic Capcom video games. He directed early Capcom titles such as the run-and-gun shooter Commando (1985), the platformers Ghosts 'n Goblins (1985) and Bionic Commando (1987), and the survival horror game Sweet Home (1989). He was also a main producer for the Mega Man series and worked on the CP System arcade game Strider (1989). He also conceived of Resident Evil (1996) as a remake of his earlier game Sweet Home, and worked on the game as general producer. He worked as the general manager of the Capcom Console Games Division from 1988 to 1996. 

After working at Capcom for thirteen years, he left the company to form his own studio, Whoopee Camp. His last game was Ghosts 'n Goblins Resurrection for former employer Capcom. He is notorious for making his titles difficult for the average video game player and strict personality among peers. IGN listed Fujiwara at number 13 in its "Top 100 Game Creators of All Time" list.

Works

Interviews
Ultimate Ghosts 'n Goblins (1UP)
The Lair of Hungry Ghosts (Famitsu, translated by GamePro)
The Man Who Made Ghosts'n Goblins (Famitsu, translated by GlitterBerri)

Notes

References

External links
Tokuro Fujiwara at MobyGames

1961 births
Capcom people
Japanese video game designers
Japanese video game directors
Japanese video game producers
Konami people
Living people